The Wilson River is a river in the Kimberley region of Western Australia.

The headwaters of the river rise in the Durack Range below Kangaroo Hill and near Bedford Downs, then flow in a north-easterly direction. The river flows past Nellie Range, through Devils Elbow and Gordons Gorge and through the O'Donnell Range.

The traditional owners of the area are the Kitja people.

References

Rivers of the Kimberley region of Western Australia